Drag Race is a drag queen reality competition television franchise, created by American drag entertainer RuPaul with production company World of Wonder. The franchise originated in the United States with RuPaul's Drag Race, where it premiered in 2009. The series primary objectives is finding the first (or next) "Drag Superstar" who possesses the traits of "charisma, uniqueness, nerve, and talent". The original series is often credited for bringing drag into the "mainstream" media.

As of 2023, RuPaul's Drag Race has produced fifteen seasons and has spawned several spin-off series such as: RuPaul's Drag U (2010–2012), RuPaul's Drag Race All Stars, and RuPaul's Secret Celebrity Drag Race. With the series being popular, three drag fan conventions have been created: RuPaul's DragCon LA, RuPaul's DragCon NYC, and RuPaul's DragCon UK.

With the American series being popular, a Thai production company acquired the rights to create their own Thai adaptation of RuPaul's Drag Race. With the Thai adaptation being successful, it spawned many international adaptations of the American series. Ten adaptations in total have been made, with five more are on the way.

History

2008–2017: Drag Race beginnings 

In mid-2008, it was revealed that RuPaul had begun producing a new reality television game show. The show was pitched to Logo and they immediately picked the show up for a season, which aired in February 2009, where it was devised as a replacement for Rick & Steve: The Happiest Gay Couple in All the World (2007–2009). The winner of the first season of RuPaul's Drag Race (and the Drag Race franchise) was BeBe Zahara Benet. 

In preparation for the new series, RuPaul made guest appearances on several shows in 2008, including as a guest judge on season five, episode six of Project Runway and as a guest chef on Paula's Party. RuPaul revealed that the show's intent was to find a winner possessing the traits of "charisma, uniqueness, nerve, and talent". RuPaul has stated that the show looks for an entertainer who can stand out from the rest.

In March 2012, it was announced that an "all-stars" spin-off from the original show was set to premiere in late 2012 through Logo (which later moved to VH1, then onto Paramount+). It was announced as RuPaul's Drag Race All Stars, and the winner for the first season was Chad Michaels.

RuPaul's Drag Race was the first international edition of the franchise to be produced and broadcast. The program proved a success for Logo and additionally moved to higher profile channel: VH1, for their ninth season. However, the reality show still remained airing on Logo. In November 2017, World of Wonder launched their subscription streaming service WOW Presents Plus. The service provides access to its exclusive library of the Drag Race franchise, and web series from WOWPresents' YouTube channel.

2018–present: International expansion of Drag Race 
In February 2018, it was announced that a Thai adaptation of RuPaul's Drag Race was set to premiere through Thailand. The reality competition series was licensed by the Kantana Group. The show was named as Drag Race Thailand with its judges and co-hosts: Art Arya and Pangina Heals. The first season winner for Drag Race Thailand was Natalia Pliacam.

In June 2018, the producers of the RuPaul's Drag Race hinted that a British adaptation of the show was in the works. It was later confirmed that Fenton Bailey, Randy Barbato and RuPaul had a meeting with the BBC and that "something is coming, be afraid – be very afraid. Nothing’s impossible." A year later, it was revealed that the first season of RuPaul's Drag Race UK was set to premiere through BBC Three and WOW Presents Plus. RuPaul and Michelle Visage continued to be the main judges of the British adaptation, with Alan Carr and Graham Norton as recurring judges. The Vivienne was crowned to be "UK's First Drag Superstar" for the debut season.

At RuPaul's DragCon NYC, it was announced that a Las Vegas residency was set to play on January 26, 2020, starring its Drag Race alumni. RuPaul's Drag Race Live! features a mix of original music, lip syncs, comedy, and dance numbers directed by RuPaul and choreographed by Drag Race resident choreographer Jamal Sims. On July 26, 2020, a six-part documentary series called: RuPaul's Drag Race: Vegas Revue, was announced and premiered on August 21, 2020.

From 2020–2022, seven international adaptations of RuPaul's Drag Race were revealed and premiered. In North America, a Canadian adaptation premiered on July 2, 2020. In Europe, four adaptations premiered from the Netherlands, Spain, Italy, and France. In Australia, RuPaul's Drag Race Down Under premiered on May 1, 2021, with RuPaul, Michelle Visage, and Rhys Nicholson judging. In August 2022, Drag Race Philippines premiered with Paolo Ballesteros as head judge, and it concluded with the first winner of the Phillipine adaptation as Precious Paula Nicole.

In August 2022, the production company of RuPaul's Drag Race announced casting calls for three new spin-offs; they will take place in Mexico, Brazil, and Germany. In September, streaming service Atresplayer Premium, announced an "all-stars" adaptation for Spain, where it will premier after the third season. In November, the production company World of Wonder partnered with O4 Media to develop more adaptations of the Drag Race franchise, including RuPaul's Secret Celebrity Drag Race and expansions throughout Asia including India, Japan, Singapore, and South Korea.

Drag Race franchises by country

Spin-off shows and one-off specials

References

2009 television series debuts
Competitions
 
Television franchises